The 2004 European Parliament election in Finland was the election of MEP representing Finland constituency for the 2004-2009 term of the European Parliament. It was part of the wider 2004 European election. The vote took place on 13 June. Both the Finnish Social Democratic Party and the Finnish Centre Party improved their vote at the expense of the conservative National Coalition Party and the Greens.

Results

Most voted-for candidates

External links 
Elected Members of European Parliament 2004 (as of 18 June 2004, i.e. after election but before regrouping)
Nomination of candidates in European Parliament elections 2004 (as of 1 June 2004, i.e. before election)
Summary (as of 23 June 2004, i.e. after election but before regrouping)

References

Finland
European Parliament elections in Finland
European